"I Want My Money Back" is a song recorded by American country music artist Sammy Kershaw.  It was released in January 2003 as the first single and title track from the album I Want My Money Back.  The song reached #33 on the Billboard Hot Country Singles & Tracks chart.  The song was written by Sam Tate, Annie Tate and Dave Berg.

Chart performance

References

2003 singles
2003 songs
Songs written by Dave Berg (songwriter)
Song recordings produced by Richard Landis
MNRK Music Group singles